Albert Larsen (5 April 1901 – 5 September 1985) was a Danish middle-distance runner. He competed in the 800 metres at the 1924 Summer Olympics and the 1928 Summer Olympics.

References

External links
 

1901 births
1985 deaths
Athletes (track and field) at the 1924 Summer Olympics
Athletes (track and field) at the 1928 Summer Olympics
Danish male middle-distance runners
Olympic athletes of Denmark
Place of birth missing
20th-century Danish people